An annular solar eclipse will occur on October 24, 2060. A solar eclipse occurs when the Moon passes between Earth and the Sun, thereby totally or partly obscuring the image of the Sun for a viewer on Earth. An annular solar eclipse occurs when the Moon's apparent diameter is smaller than the Sun's, blocking most of the Sun's light and causing the Sun to look like an annulus (ring). An annular eclipse appears as a partial eclipse over a region of the Earth thousands of kilometres wide.

Related eclipses

Solar eclipses 2059–2061

Saros 144 

It is a part of Saros cycle 144, repeating every 18 years, 11 days, containing 70 events. The series started with partial solar eclipse on April 11, 1736. It contains annular eclipses from July 7, 1880 through August 27, 2565. There are no total eclipses in the series. The series ends at member 70 as a partial eclipse on May 5, 2980. The longest duration of annularity will be 9 minutes, 52 seconds on December 29, 2168.
<noinclude>

Metonic series

References

External links 
 http://eclipse.gsfc.nasa.gov/SEplot/SEplot2051/SE2060Oct24A.GIF

2060 10 24
2060 in science
2060 10 24
2060 10 24